Statistics of League of Ireland in the 1954/1955 season.

Overview
It was contested by 12 teams, and St Patrick's Athletic F.C. won the championship for the second time.

Final classification

Results

Top scorers

Ireland
League of Ireland seasons
1954–55 in Republic of Ireland association football